Qoornup Qeqertarsua Island is an uninhabited island in the Sermersooq municipality in southwestern Greenland.

Geography
Qoornup Qeqertarsua is one of three mountainous islands located in the middle run of the  Nuup Kangerlua fjord, to the north of Nuuk, the capital of Greenland. It has a  mountain. The two sibling islands are Qeqertarsuaq Island and Sermitsiaq Island.

See also
List of islands of Greenland

References

Uninhabited islands of Greenland